Astroblepus heterodon is a species of catfish of the family Astroblepidae. It can be found in the rivers which drain the Pacific slope of Colombia where its populations are vulnerable to pollution from gold mining.

References

Bibliography
Eschmeyer, William N., ed. 1998. Catalog of Fishes. Special Publication of the Center for Biodiversity Research and Information, num. 1, vol. 1–3. California Academy of Sciences. San Francisco, California, United States. 2905. .

Astroblepus
Fish described in 1908
Freshwater fish of Colombia